Buruanga, officially the Municipality of Buruanga (Aklanon: Banwa it Buruanga; Hiligaynon: Banwa sang Buruanga),  is a 5th class municipality in the province of Aklan, Philippines. It is the farthest town of Aklan from its provincial capital. According to the 2020 census, it has a population of 19,357 people.

History
The name Buruanga came from the word Busuanga meaning "eruption" or "swell". Frequently harassed by inundations from the river, the early residents constructed earthen dams which were subsequently washed away. The people named the river "Busuanga," which later became the name of the Municipality. When the Spaniards arrived, they renamed Busuanga to Buruanga, or perhaps the change was purely a clerical error. The present municipality of Malay, including Boracay, was once a part of Buruanga. On June 15, 1949, the enactment of Republic Act 391 separated Malay from Buruanga to become an independent municipality.

It was hit severely by typhoon Seniang on 9–10 December 2006, with much destruction and damage of homes and infrastructure.

Geography
Buruanga is located at the western tip of Panay Island. It is a coastal town bounded on the north by Malay; south by Libertad, Antique; and west by the Cuyo East Pass of the Sulu Sea.

According to the Philippine Statistics Authority, the municipality has a land area of  constituting  of the  total area of Aklan.

Climate

There is one prevailing type of climate identified as Type I, two pronounced seasons which are dry from November to April and wet for the rest of the year. This is also true in all municipalities of Western Aklan such as Malay (excluding Boracay Island) and Nabas, as well as the Western portion of the municipalities bounding Antique.

The wet season coincides with the planting of rice while offshore fishing is in full gear during the dry season. Typhoons and strong winds rarely occur, and if it ever occurs, it coincides with the wet season. The humid north-western monsoon arrives in the area by June causing an increase in rainfall which reaches its peak in the month of August.

Barangays
Buruanga is politically subdivided into 15 barangays.

Demographics

In the 2020 census, Buruanga had a population of 19,357.

Economy

Tourism
Despite its proximity to Boracay, one of the most popular tourist destinations in the Philippines, Buruanga sees very few tourists. Various scenic spots such as caves, waterfalls, beaches, hills, and mountain parks are found throughout the area such as the Hinugtan White Beach, Batason (Ariel's) Point, Langka Beach, Nasog Beach, Tuburan Baybay Beach, Tigis Beach/Falls, and Pagatpat Mangrove Park.

Flora and fauna
The upland barangay of Tag-Osip contains a portion of the Northwest Panay Peninsula Natural Park which is contained within the municipalities of Buruanga, Malay, and Nabas in Aklan Province and Libertad and Pandan in Antique. The park is home to many important plant and animal species such as the Visayan leopard cat, the blue-necked parrot, the Visayan hornbill, and the roughneck monitor lizard.

In 2011, several researchers from the United States Peace Corps conducted various biological assessments along the Buruanga coastline. It was found that Buruanga hosts 4 different species of mangroves including large tracts of nypa found in the barangays of Alegria, Balusbos, Poblacion, and Santander. Other species including pagatpat, bakawan, and piyapi are concentrated in Pagatpat Mangrove Park in barangay Panilongan with a few trees in spotted areas in barangay Santander. Buruanga also is home to 5 different species of seagrass identified including Cymodocea rotundata, Cymodocea serrulata, Halodule pinifolia, Halophila ovalis and Thalassia hemprichii.

References

External links

 [ Philippine Standard Geographic Code]

Municipalities of Aklan